Yare Broads and Marshes is a  biological Site of Special Scientific Interest east of Norwich in Norfolk, England. Part of the site, is a Nature Conservation Review site, Grade I and most of it is in the Mid-Yare National Nature Reserve. It is part of the Broadland Ramsar site and Special Protection Area, and The Broads Special Area of Conservation. Two ares are Royal Society for the Protection of Birds nature reserves, Strumpshaw Fen and Surlingham Church Marsh. 

This is a nationally important wetland site, with grazing marsh, open water, fen, carr woodland and peat. There are many nationally rare plants and many birds including nationally important wintering flocks of wigeon.

References

Sites of Special Scientific Interest in Norfolk